Sadhar is a town near Faisalabad, Pakistan, that is situated about  from Faisalabad International Airport. It has a population of about 0.2 million.

Transport 
Rikshaws are the main form of local transportation in Sadhar.

Livelihood
Sadhar's textile mills, which contain power looms, are the main source of livelihood for its middle-class citizens.
 
Some people, rely heavily on Agriculture for their income.

Population
The population (0.2 million) of Sadhar is mostly Muslim with a Christian minority.

References 

Cities and towns in Faisalabad District